The Matte family is a rich, powerful and influential Chilean family of Catalan origin. According to Forbes magazine, their wealth amounts to US$2.7 billion (2007).

Family origins

The Matte family's rise to power began in the 19th century when Francisco Javier Matte and his wife opened a textile store in downtown Santiago. In 1855 their son Domingo (who fathered 16 children) opened a bank in Valparaíso with two of his sons, Augusto and Eduardo.

Prominent members

Claudio Matte: created the Matte syllabary and was rector of the University of Chile
Augusto Matte: lawyer, diplomat, deputy and senator; also Finance Minister and Justice Minister
Luis Matte Larraín
Eugenio Matte Hurtado
Arturo Matte Alessandri
Luis Matte Valdés: minister under Salvador Allende
Eliodoro Matte Ossa: owner of the Compañía Manufacturera de Papeles y Cartones paper mill (La Papelera) who famously protested President Allende's attempt to nationalize it
María Patricia Matte Larraín: president of the Primary Instruction Society, owner of several schools for poor children in Santiago
Eliodoro Matte Larraín: president of conservative and influential think-tank Public Studies Center Centro de Estudios Públicos, CEP)
Bernardo Matte Larraín
Magdalena Matte Lecaros: Minister of Housing & Urbanism; wife of senator Hernán Larraín
María Olga Matte Lira: actress, wife of economist and politician Guillermo Larraín
Ricardo Matte Pérez: lawyer, senator and minister
Pablo Larraín Matte: filmmaker, director of [[No (2012 film)|No]]
Máximo Pacheco Matte: current minister of Energy

Sources
"The World's Billionaires (Chile)" Forbes
“La sagrada familia”: Un recorrido por las dinastías chilenas Revista Cosas

 
Chilean families